Keak Hendrix is the fifth full-length studio solo album released by Keak Da Sneak on December 6, 2011.

Track listing
Disc 1
 "We Ready" (featuring Young Lot) - 3:51
 "Format" - 2:40
 "They So Wet" - 3:39
 "Punk Ho" - 3:24
 "I Do What I Rap About" - 2:54
 "Rollin" - 3:21
 "The Weekend" - 2:29
 "Mane Squeeze" - 3:18
 "Woofers Knockin" - 2:07
 "Automatic Wit the Money" (featuring Ike Dolla) - 3:35
 "Aint Going Nowhere" - 3:24
 "They Call Me" - 3:13
 "Really Wit It" - 3:10
 "Mob Music" - 3:35
 "If I Wanted" - 2:07
 "Usual" (featuring Matt Blaque)- 3:05

References 

Keak da Sneak albums
2011 albums